Bastian Kolmsee (born 11 March 1981 in Engelskirchen, Germany) is a German racing driver who won the 2004 German Formula 3 Championship.

he began karting in 1993 before moving up the domestic Formula Ford and Formula VW championships. He moved up to Formula 3 in 2004, winning the championship in his first season.

He has more recently been seen in the German Seat Leon Cupra Cup.

References
Official Website
Speedsport Magazine

1981 births
Living people
German racing drivers
German Formula Three Championship drivers
People from Oberbergischer Kreis
Sportspeople from Cologne (region)
Racing drivers from North Rhine-Westphalia